Popular Union may refer to:
Popular Union of Equatorial Guinea
Union populaire française (France)
Popular Union Party (Panama)
Popular Union (Peru)
Union populaire (Quebec)
Popular Union for the Republic (Togo)

Other uses include:
Democratic and Popular Union (Bolivia)
Federal Popular Union (Argentina)
National Union of Popular Forces (Morocco)
New Ecologic and Social People's Union (France)
Popular National Union (Poland)
Popular Political Union of Trentino (Italy)
Popular Socialist Union (Chile)
Popular Unions of Bipartisan Social Groups (Greece)
Union for a Popular Movement (France)

See also 
People's Union
Popular Unity
People's Movement
Popular front
People's Party
Popular Democratic Union
Popular Republican Union